Robert John Deachman (15 December 1878 – 17 February 1955) was a Liberal party member of the House of Commons of Canada. He was born in Howick Township, Ontario and became a journalist.

Deachman attended the Ontario Agricultural College and attained a Bachelor of Science in Agriculture degree.

He was first elected to Parliament at the Huron North riding in the 1935 general election. After completing one term, the 18th Canadian Parliament, Deachman was defeated in the 1940 election by Elston Cardiff.

Deachman authored various works such as Tory Markets ( 1935, Dadson-Merrill Press), The transportation Muddle and the Way Out ( 1919, Western Canada Publishing) and The Wheat Board Fallacy ( 1919, Western Canada Publishing). Deachman also contributed a preface to Frédéric Bastiat's book Economic Fallacies.

References

External links
 
 Robert John Deachman Fonds at Library and Archives Canada

1878 births
1955 deaths
Members of the House of Commons of Canada from Ontario
Liberal Party of Canada MPs
People from Huron County, Ontario